The New Brunswick Liberal Association held a leadership election in 1985 to replace former leader Doug Young, the elected leader would face four-term premier Richard Hatfield in an election expected in 1986.  Frank McKenna defeated legislative veteran Ray Frenette, who had served as the party's interim leader until early 1985.

Candidates
Ray Frenette, MLA since 1974 and interim leader from 1982 to 1985.
Frank McKenna, MLA since 1982.

Results

References

New Brunswick Liberal Association leadership election
Liberal Association leadership election
New Brunswick Liberal Association Leadership elections
New Brunswick Liberal Association leadership election
New Brunswick Liberal Association leadership election